Dysgonia abnegans is a moth of the family Noctuidae first described by Francis Walker in 1858. It is found in Africa, including Kenya and South Africa.

References

Dysgonia
Moths of Africa
Moths described in 1858